Sandip Foundation is a private institute/college in Mahiravani, Nasik, Maharashtra, India. Sandip Foundation has three academic divisions
Its 250+ acre primary campus is approximately 13 km from Nasik, near Trimbakeshawar.

Affiliated to Savitribai Phule Pune University.

To Sandip Foundation has approximately 4000 undergraduate and 1000 diploma students studying in its two polytechnics, Two Engineering colleges, Accreditation by NAAC( 'A' Grade)    degree pharmacy College and one MBA college — Sandip Institute of Technology and Research Center (SITRC), Sandip Institute of Engineering & Management (SIEM), Sandip Poytechnic (SP), Sandip Institute Of Polytechnic (SIP) and Sandip Institute of Pharmaceutical Sciences (SIPS).

Courses offered

Sandip Institute Of Technology & Research Centre (SITRC)  
 Computer Engineering
 Information Technology
 
 Electronics & Telecommunication Engineering
Electrical Engineering
 Mechanical Engineering
 M.B.A
 M.E. in Computer Engineering
 M.E. in Electronics & Telecommunication Engineering
Sandip Institute of Engineering & Management (SIEM)
 Civil Engineering
 Computer Engineering
 Electrical Engineering
 Mechanical Engineering
 Electronics & Telecommunication Engineering

Sandip Polytechnic (SP) 

 Computer Engineering
 Civil Engineering
 Electrical Engineering
 Electronics & Telecommunication Engineering
 Mechanical Engineering
 Information Technology

Sandip Institute of Polytechnic (SIP) 
 Civil Engineering
 Computer Engineering
 Electrical Engineering
 Electronics & Telecommunication Engineering
 Mechanical Engineering

Sandip Institute of Pharmaceutical Sciences (SIPS) 
 D. Pharmacy
 B. Pharmacy 
 M. Pharmacy in Pharmaceutics
 M. Pharmacy in Quality Assurance

References

External links 
 

Universities and colleges in Maharashtra
Education in Nashik
Colleges affiliated to Savitribai Phule Pune University